Payyanur State assembly constituency is one of the 140 state legislative assembly constituencies in Kerala state in southern India.  It is also one of the 7 state legislative assembly constituencies included in the Kasaragod Lok Sabha constituency.
 As of the 2021 assembly elections, the current MLA is T. I. Madusoodhanan of CPI(M).

Local self governed segments
Payyanur Niyamasabha constituency is composed of the following local self-governed segments:

Members of Legislative Assembly 
The following list contains all members of Kerala legislative assembly who have represented the constituency:

Key

Election results

Niyamasabha Election 2021 

There were 1,80,460 registered voters in the constituency for the 2021 election.

Niyamasabha Election 2016 
There were 1,75,438 registered voters in the constituency for the 2016 election.

Niyamasabha Election 2011 
There were 1,58,613 registered voters in the constituency for the 2011 election.

1952

See also
 Payyanur
 Kannur district
 List of constituencies of the Kerala Legislative Assembly
 2016 Kerala Legislative Assembly election

References 

Assembly constituencies of Kerala

State assembly constituencies in Kannur district